The 2006 Berlin Thunder season was the eighth season for the franchise in the NFL Europe League (NFLEL). The team was led by head coach Rick Lantz in his third year, and played its home games at Olympic Stadium and Jahn-Sportpark in Berlin, Germany. They finished the regular season in sixth place with a record of two wins, seven losses and one tie.

Offseason

Free agent draft

Personnel

Staff

Roster

Schedule

Standings

Game summaries

Week 1: at Amsterdam Admirals

Week 2: vs Rhein Fire

Week 3: at Hamburg Sea Devils

Week 4: vs Amsterdam Admirals

Week 5: vs Cologne Centurions

Week 6: at Frankfurt Galaxy

Week 7: at Rhein Fire

Week 8: vs Hamburg Sea Devils

Week 9: at Cologne Centurions

Week 10: vs Frankfurt Galaxy

Honors
After the completion of the regular season, the All-NFL Europe League team was selected by the NFLEL coaching staffs, members of a media panel and fans voting online at NFLEurope.com. Overall, Berlin had three players selected. The selections were:

 Chad Beasley, guard
 Anthony Floyd, safety
 Christian Mohr, national player

Notes

References

Berlin
Berlin Thunder seasons